Ethmia piperella is a moth in the family Depressariidae. It is found in Jamaica and Cuba.

The ground color of the forewings is greyish tan, but the dorsal area somewhat paler and not well defined. The ground colour of the hindwings is uniform pale grey.

References

Moths described in 1973
piperella